Grigory Avetovich Dzhanshiyev (29 May 1851, in Tiflis, Russian Empire, now Georgia – 30 July 1900, in Moscow, Russian Empire) was Russian lawyer, publicist and historian of Armenian descent. A Moscow University alumnus, Dzhanshiyev authored 25 books, the best-known of which, On the Times of the Great Reform (Из эпохи великих реформ, 1892), was re-issued several times in his lifetime and is considered one of the best treatises on Alexander II's reforms in law and jurisdiction. Dzhanshiyev was also one of the authors of the Brockhaus and Efron Encyclopedic Dictionary.

References 

Russian lawyers
19th-century historians from the Russian Empire
Russian journalists
Armenian lawyers
Ethnic Armenian historians
Armenian journalists
19th-century historians from Georgia (country)
Journalists from Tbilisi
Lawyers from Tbilisi
Georgian people of Armenian descent
Russian people of Armenian descent
1851 births
1900 deaths
Writers from Tbilisi